Sant'Andrea in Campo is a Romanesque style, Roman Catholic church in Montefiascone, province of Viterbo, Italy.

History
The church is mentioned in documents from the year 853 as a church in Campo or in a rural location. The church while narrow and later within the town walls, had three naves. The portal and internal columns are Romanesque.

References

Roman Catholic churches in Montefiascone
Romanesque architecture in Lazio